Tero Määttä (born January 2, 1982) is a Finnish ice hockey defenceman who currently plays for Ässät of the SM-liiga. Although selected by the San Jose Sharks in the 2000 NHL Entry Draft, he never appeared in an NHL game.

Career statistics

Regular season and playoffs

International

External links

1982 births
Living people
Ässät players
Espoo Blues players
Finnish ice hockey defencemen
San Jose Sharks draft picks
Sportspeople from Vantaa